Marilyn S. Kozak is an American professor of biochemistry at the Robert Wood Johnson Medical School. She was previously at the University of Medicine and Dentistry of New Jersey before the school was merged. She was awarded a PhD in microbiology by Johns Hopkins University studying the synthesis of the Bacteriophage MS2, advised by Daniel Nathans. In her original faculty job proposal, she sought to study the mechanism of eukaryotic translation initiation, a problem long thought to have already been solved by Joan Steitz. 
 While in the Department of Biological Sciences at University of Pittsburgh, she published a series of studies that established the scanning model of translation initiation and the Kozak consensus sequence. Her current research interests are unknown as her last publication was in 2008.

Recognition 
Marilyn Kozak was listed as one of the top 10 Women Scientists of the 80's in an article published by The Scientist. This was awarded based on the number of citations for their published work between 1981-1988. During this time, Kozak had 3,107 citations. Her most cited work was from 1984, entitled "Compilation and analysis of sequences upstream from the translational start site in eukaryotic mRNAs". This paper highlighted the research that brought the known cellular mRNAs from 32 to 166.

Controversy 

In March 2001, Kozak published a mini-review in the Journal of Molecular and Cellular Biology entitled "New Ways of Initiating Translation in Eukaryotes?" that resulted in push-back from the scientific community. In her publication, Kozak discussed her hesitation towards the role of cellular internal ribosome entry sites (IRES). This was most heavily refuted by Robert Schneider, who published a response article of the same name in the same Journal in Dec. 2001. In this response, Schneider claimed that in publishing her mini-review, Kozak hoped to increase the validity of her own findings. He further stated that Kozak's publication was not up to scholarly standards and should not have been accepted into the Journal of Molecular and Cellular Biology. Later work largely supports Kozak's claim that the existence of most cellular IRESes is not supported by the available evidence. Later impacts of this controversy, including a suggestion that Kozak was defunded by the National Institute of Health (NIH), was explored in the blog post "First Human Bioinformatician Criticizes Bad Science Of NIH-Funded Bigshots Disappears", written in 2015.

Contributions 
Along with her published work, Kozak has contributed to the scientific community with her role on the editorial board for the Journal of Molecular and Cellular Biology. She has been listed intermittently as an editor between the years 1983-1991.

Selected works 
This is a selection of Kozak's work but not a complete list.

.

References 

Living people
Place of birth missing (living people)
American women biochemists
Johns Hopkins University alumni
University of Pittsburgh faculty
1943 births
American women academics
21st-century American women